Cherré may refer to: 

Cherré (archaeological site), in the Sarthe department, France
Cherré, Maine-et-Loire, a commune in the Maine-et-Loire department, France
Cherré, Sarthe, a commune in the Sarthe department, France